James Weston may refer to:

James A. Weston (1827–1895), American civil engineer, banker, and politician
Jimmy Weston (born 1955), English footballer
James Weston (MP) for Lichfield (UK Parliament constituency)
Jimmy Weston (singer)